The 2010 Incarnate Word Cardinals football team represented the University of the Incarnate Word in the 2010 NCAA Division II football season. Home games were played at Gayle and Tom Benson Stadium. They finished the season 3–8, 2–6 in Lone Star play to finish in a tie for ninth place.

Previous season
The Cardinals finished the 2009 season with a record of 5–5 as an NCAA Division II independent.

Schedule

Source:

Personnel
Source:

Coaching staff

Roster

Depth chart

References

Incarnate Word
Incarnate Word Cardinals football seasons
Incarnate Word Cardinals football